The Second Battle of Dalton was fought August 14–15, 1864, between Union and Confederate forces in Whitfield County northern Georgia.

Battle 

Confederate cavalry, commanded by Maj. Gen. Joseph Wheeler raided northern Georgia to disrupt William T. Sherman's supply lines and destroy the railroad track, hoping to force Sherman to retreat from the state. On August 14, Wheeler demanded the surrender of the Union garrison at Dalton, Georgia, commanded by Colonel Bernard Laiboldt. Laiboldt refused and held out inside his fortifications, though sporadic fighting continued until midnight.

The next morning, Wheeler ended his attack and prepared to retreat. Union reinforcements arrived from Chattanooga, commanded by Maj. Gen. James B. Steedman, and engaged Wheeler's cavalry. Skirmishing continued for four hours, before the Confederates finally left the field.

The amount of damage inflicted by Wheeler on the railroad is debatable. However, Maj. Gen. George H. Thomas in Nashville reported that the track south of Dalton was quickly repaired and trains were running again within two days.

Battlefield Condition 
The growth of the City of Dalton has destroyed the battlefield landscape and its historic setting.

References

External links 
 National Park Service battle summary
 CWSAC Report Update and Resurvey: Individual Battlefield Profiles
 Laiboldt's Report as printed in the New York Times
 Lloyd's battle history of the great rebellion: Dalton, Georgia

Atlanta campaign
Battles of the Western Theater of the American Civil War
Union victories of the American Civil War
Battles of the American Civil War in Georgia (U.S. state)
Battle of Dalton Ii
Conflicts in 1864
1864 in Georgia (U.S. state)
August 1864 events